The Gay Nineties is an American nostalgic term and a periodization of the history of the United States referring to the decade of the 1890s. It is known in the United Kingdom as the Naughty Nineties, and refers there to the decade of supposedly decadent art of Aubrey Beardsley, the witty plays and trial of Oscar Wilde, society scandals and the beginning of the suffragette movement.

Despite the term, part of the decade was marked by an economic crisis, which greatly worsened when the Panic of 1893 set off a widespread economic depression in the United States that lasted until 1896.

Etymology
The term Gay Nineties itself began to be used in the 1920s in the United States and is believed to have been created by the artist Richard V. Culter, who first released a series of drawings in Life magazine titled "the Gay Nineties" and later published a book of drawings with the same name.

History
Novels by authors like Edith Wharton and Booth Tarkington documented the high life of the "old money" families. By the 1920s, the decade was nostalgically seen as a period of pre-income tax wealth for a newly emergent "society set". The railroads, the agricultural depression of the Southern United States, and the dominance of the United States in South American markets and the Caribbean meant that industrialists of the Northern United States seemed to have been doing very well.

It was also the name of a nostalgic radio program in the 1930s, hosted by a prominent composer of popular songs of the 1890s, Joe Howard, as well as an 1890s-themed New York cafe, "Bill's Gay Nineties", during that same period. From the 1920s to the 1960s, filmmakers had a nostalgic interest in the 1890s, as can be seen in the films The Naughty Nineties, She Done Him Wrong, Belle of the Nineties, The Strawberry Blonde, My Gal Sal, The Nifty Nineties (a Mickey Mouse cartoon), By the Light of the Silvery Moon, Hello, Dolly!, and  Heaven Can Wait.

Roger Edens' song, "The Gay Nineties", opens a production number spoofing period melodramas in the 1940 film Strike up the Band, one of MGM's smash vehicles for Judy Garland and Mickey Rooney.

See also

 Belle Époque
 Gilded Age
 Victorian era

References

 
1890s in the United States
Fin de siècle
Eras of United States history
1890s
1890s economic history
1920s neologisms
Nostalgia in the United States